DeWitt Jones (born c. 1943) is a former American football coach. He was the 11th head football coach at Abilene Christian University in Abilene, Texas, serving two seasons, from 1977 to 1978, and compiling a record of 18–4–1  His coaching record at Abilene Christian was 18–4–1. In 1977, his team won the NAIA Division I National Football Championship. Jones was named the NAIA Division I National Coach of the Year.

Jones won a high school state championship in 1973 at Troup High School in Troup, Texas. He is one of two coaches in Texas who has won a state championship on the high school level and a national championship at the college level. In 2005, Jones was inducted into the Abilene Christian Sports Hall of Fame.

Head coaching record

College

References

Year of birth missing (living people)
1940s births
Living people
American football ends
Abilene Christian Wildcats football coaches
Abilene Christian Wildcats football players
High school football coaches in Texas
Sportspeople from Tyler, Texas
Coaches of American football from Texas
Players of American football from Texas